Highland Township is a township in Jewell County, Kansas, USA.  As of the 2000 census, its population was 49.

Geography
Highland Township covers an area of 35.91 square miles (93.01 square kilometers); of this, 0.01 square miles (0.02 square kilometers) or 0.02 percent is water.

Adjacent townships
 Walnut Township (east)
 Burr Oak Township (southeast)
 White Mound Township (south)
 White Rock Township, Smith County (southwest)
 Logan Township, Smith County (west)

Cemeteries
The township contains one cemetery, Highland.

References
 U.S. Board on Geographic Names (GNIS)
 United States Census Bureau cartographic boundary files

External links
 US-Counties.com
 City-Data.com

Townships in Jewell County, Kansas
Townships in Kansas